There is also a Martin Luther King, Jr., Park in Oberlin, Ohio.
Martin Luther King Jr. Park, originally The Parade and after 1896, Humboldt Park, is a historic park located in Buffalo in Erie County, New York.  The park is located in east Buffalo and bisected by Fillmore Avenue.

The park was listed on the National Register of Historic Places in 1982. It contains four contributing structures: The brick Shelter House (1904), Buffalo Museum of Science building (1926), Greenhouse (1907), and Humboldt Park Casino (ca. 1926).

History
The park was designed in 1874 by Frederick Law Olmsted and originally connected to Delaware Park via the Humboldt Parkway.  That connection was lost in the early 1960s with the construction of the Kensington Expressway.  The park originally contained a large wooden refectory, designed by Calvert Vaux; it was destroyed by fire in 1877.

In July 2009, a neatly manicured, tree-and flower-filled pedestrian pathway was unveiled by the Buffalo Olmsted Parks Conservancy.

See also
Buffalo, New York parks system

References

External links
Buffalo Olmsted Parks Conservancy – Buffalo, NY, Western New York, WNY, Olmsted, Frederick Law
Buffalo as an Architectural Museum, Martin Luther King Jr. Park
Buffalo as an Architectural Museum, "Municipal Parks and City Planning: Frederick Law Olmsted's Buffalo Park and Parkway System," by Francis R. Kowsky, Reprinted with permission from the Journal of the Society of Architectural Historians, March 1987.
Martin Luther King Jr. Park – Buffalo, NY – Olmsted designed parks on Waymarking.com

Parks on the National Register of Historic Places in New York (state)
1874 establishments in New York (state)
Geography of Buffalo, New York
Parks in Erie County, New York
Frederick Law Olmsted works
National Register of Historic Places in Buffalo, New York
Memorials to Martin Luther King Jr.